Préchac is the name of several communes in France:

 Préchac, Gers
 Préchac, Gironde
 Préchac, Hautes-Pyrénées
 Préchac-sur-Adour, Gers

See also 
 Préchacq (disambiguation)